The Waiorongomai River is a river of the Gisborne Region of New Zealand's North Island. It rises on the southern slopes of Mount Raukumara, flowing generally southeast to reach the Tapuaeroa River ten kilometres west of Ruatoria.

See also
List of rivers of New Zealand

References

Rivers of the Gisborne District
Rivers of New Zealand